Papoutsis is a Greek surname. Notable people with the surname include:

 Christos Papoutsis (born 1953), Greek politician
 Konstantinos Papoutsis (born 1979), Greek footballer
 Yianni Papoutsis, British restaurateur

Greek-language surnames